, also known as The Road, is a 1955 black-and-white Japanese film directed by Hiroshi Inagaki.

Production design was by Takeo Kita and Makoto Sono and sound recording was by Choshichiro Mikami. The lighting technician was Shigeru Mori.

Cast

References

External links 
 

1955 films
Jidaigeki films
Japanese black-and-white films
Films directed by Hiroshi Inagaki
Toho films
1950s Japanese films